Norwalk High School may refer to:

Norwalk High School (California), Norwalk, California
Norwalk High School (Connecticut), Norwalk, Connecticut
Norwalk High School (Iowa), Norwalk, Iowa
Norwalk High School (Ohio), Norwalk, Ohio